Bernardino Freire de Andrade e Castro (Lisbon, 18 February 1759 – Braga, 17 March 1809) was a Portuguese Army general officer who was appointed, in July 1808, commander-in-chief of the Portuguese forces in the north of the country during the Peninsular War.

Early career

War of the Pyrenees

Freire saw action in the Roussillon in 1794-1795.

Peninsular War

In July 1808, the Supreme Junta of Oporto appointed Freire commander-in-chief of the Portuguese forces in the north of the country.

Highly critical of the Convention of Cintra (August 1808), by which Junot's French forces were allowed to leave Portugal after their defeat at Vimeiro by the Anglo-Portuguese forces commanded by Sir Arthur Wellesley, Freire was also resentful of British influence in the country.

Freire died at Braga, lynched by a mob. Having secretly fled from Braga, he had been seized by the Ordenanza of Tobossa, and brought back to the camp as a prisoner. His second-in-command, Baron Eben, the colonel of the 2nd battalion of the Lusitanian Legion, had then thrown him into the gaol of Braga. Members of the Ordenanza later returned, dragged Freire out, and killed him in the street with their pikes. That same day, they also murdered Major Villasboas, the chief of Freire’s engineers, and one or more of his aides-de-camp.

The commander of the British invasion force, Sir Arthur Wellesley complained that it was difficult to cooperate with Freire.

Promotions and Units

References

Portuguese military commanders of the Napoleonic Wars
Portuguese generals
People of the Peninsular War
1759 births
1809 deaths
People from Lisbon
18th-century Portuguese people
Portuguese murder victims
19th-century Portuguese people
1809 murders in Europe